Cummins House may refer to:

Australia
Cummins House, Adelaide, South Australia, built 1842 for Sir John Morphett

United States
David J. Cummins House, Smyrna, Delaware, listed on the National Register of Historic Places (NRHP) in Kent County, Delaware
Timothy Cummins House, Smyrna, Delaware, listed on the NRHP in Kent County, Delaware
Albert Baird Cummins House, Des Moines, Iowa, listed on the NRHP in Polk County, Iowa 
John R. Cummins Farmhouse, Eden Prairie, Minnesota, NRHP-listed
David Cummins Octagon House, Conneaut, Ohio, NRHP-listed

See also
Cummings House (disambiguation)